Renmin Road Subdistrict  is a subdistrict situated in Congtai District, Handan, Hebei, China. , it administers the following five residential neighborhoods:
Kuangjian Community
Shejiyuan Community
Liming Street Community
Guangming Community
Hepingbei Community

See also
List of township-level divisions of Hebei

References

Township-level divisions of Hebei
Handan
Subdistricts of the People's Republic of China